James Morrison (November 2, 1871 – May 15, 1939) was an American college football player, coach, and physician. He served as the head football coach at Add-Ran Christian University—now known as Texas Christian University (TCU)—in 1898 and at Virginia Agricultural and Mechanical College and Polytechnic Institute (VPI)—now known as Virginia Tech—in 1899, compiling a career college football record of 5–4–1. Morrison graduated from the University of Virginia with a medical degree in 1898. He was later a pioneering otolaryngologist specialist in the south.

Head coaching record

References

1871 births
1939 deaths
19th-century players of American football
American otolaryngologists
TCU Horned Frogs football coaches
Virginia Cavaliers football players
Virginia Tech Hokies football coaches
People from Lexington, Virginia
Coaches of American football from Virginia
Players of American football from Virginia